The National Speedway Stadium is a multi-purpose stadium on Kirkmanshulme Lane, in Gorton, Manchester, England and is the home of the Belle Vue Aces and Belle Vue Colts speedway teams and the Manchester Titans American football team.

Origins and opening
In 2007, Chris Morton and David Gordon proposed that a new stadium should be built that could be used as the home for the Belle Vue Aces and be used as a national speedway stadium. Seven years later in September 2014, the planning application for the Stadium was approved by Manchester City Council. The planned site on Kirkmanshulme Lane was previously a grassed area containing hockey pitches.

Construction on the National Speedway Stadium started in October 2014 and it opened in March 2016 as part of the Belle Vue's £11 million regeneration scheme. The new stadium was built close to (separated only by synthetic hockey pitches) the former Belle Vue Stadium, which closed in 2020 and is now a site for planned housing.

History
In 2016, it hosted the Race-Off and Final of the Speedway World Cup. It was won by Poland, with Great Britain coming second.

In 2021, the stadium hosted the 2021 Speedway of Nations grand final, which was won by Great Britain.

References 

Sports venues in Manchester
Speedway venues in England
2016 establishments in England
American football venues in the United Kingdom
History of sport in Manchester